Patricia Carney  (born May 26, 1935) is a former Canadian politician who served as a member of parliament from 1980 to 1988 and as a Senator from 1990 to 2008.

A member of the Progressive Conservative Party of Canada, she first ran for the House of Commons of Canada during the 1979 Canadian federal election, but was defeated. She ran again in the election the following year and won, representing the district of Vancouver Centre. After winning a second term in the 1984 elections, she held the cabinet positions of minister of Energy, Mines and Resources from 1984 to 1986 and minister of International Trade from 1986 to 1988 under Prime Minister Brian Mulroney. She did not seek a third term during the next federal election in 1988, and was succeeded by future prime minister Kim Campbell. In 1990, Mulroney appointed her to the Senate, where she served until her resignation in 2008.

Early life 
Carney was born in Shanghai, China, the daughter of Dora May Sanders and John James Carney, a Canadian who worked as a policeman in Shanghai.

During the early part of her working life Pat Carney ran her own socio-economic consulting business in Yellowknife, NWT. Trading under the name of Gemini North, Ltd., Pat Carney developed useful contacts in the NWT Government and the oil and gas industry. Following the 1970 Centennial Royal Tour of the NWT Pat Carney, at the invitation of the NWT Commissioner, Stuart Hodgson, produced a book about the tour. Carney became a close friend of Stuart Hodgson and accompanied the Commissioner and his party in the 1971 Canadian North Pole expedition an aborted attempt to reach the Pole by Twin Otter in a bid to establish the route for tourist adventurers. Carney was accompanied by her twin brother from Montreal during the flight in and out of the Polar Basin.

Carney's contacts with the oil and gas industry resulted in her being commissioned to conduct a survey of local opinion about the installation of a gas pipeline along the Mackenzie River Valley. Carney organised an information tour of the valley with stops at all the river settlements where the fly-in pipeliners conducted workshops explaining to the local people details about the pipeline project. The pipeliner's tour was shadowed by the president of the Northwest Territories Indian Brotherhood president James Wah-shee and was seen in native rights circles as a demonstration of the Brotherhood's aim to be consulted before any pipeline work started. Shortly after this tour the Brotherhood applied for a development caveat to stop all development on treaty land. This caveat eventually led to the pipeline inquiry which resulted in the project being shelved.

A fictionalized account of these events was published in 2008.

Political career

Member of Parliament 
Carney first ran for the House of Commons of Canada as a Progressive Conservative candidate in the 1979 election and was defeated. She was elected in the 1980 election as the Member of Parliament (MP) from Vancouver Centre.

Cabinet minister 
When the Tories formed government under Prime Minister Brian Mulroney as a result of the 1984 election, Carney was appointed to Cabinet as Minister of Energy, Mines and Resources, and was responsible for dismantling the previous Canadian government's unpopular National Energy Program.

In 1986, she was named Minister of International Trade and, as such, was involved in negotiating the Canada-US Free Trade Agreement.

Carney did not run for re-election in the 1988 election.

Senator 
In 1990, she was appointed to the Canadian Senate by Governor General Ray Hnatyshyn. Carney, a pro-choice advocate of women's rights to abortion, voted against the abortion law proposed by her successor as MP for Vancouver Centre, Kim Campbell. The bill failed in the Senate in a tie vote.  In 2000 Carney acted on concerns that landmark lighthouses on both Canadian coasts were being neglected by teaming up with Senator Mike Forrestall from Nova Scotia to introduce the Heritage Lighthouse Protection Act, a private members bill which enjoyed consistent multi-party support in subsequent minority Parliaments and which received royal assent in 2008.

Carney had mused that the Province of British Columbia might benefit from separating from Canada.

On October 11, 2007, the Prime Minister's Office announced that Senator Carney intended to resign, two years in advance of the mandatory retirement age of 75 years. She officially resigned on January 31, 2008. In 2011, she was made a Member of the Order of Canada "for her public service as a journalist, politician and senator."

Archives 
There are Patricia Carney fonds at Library and Archives Canada and the University of British Columbia.

Electoral history

References

External links 
 Senator Pat Carney personal site
 

1935 births
Living people
Canadian senators from British Columbia
Progressive Conservative Party of Canada senators
Conservative Party of Canada senators
Members of the King's Privy Council for Canada
Members of the Order of British Columbia
Members of the Order of Canada
Members of the House of Commons of Canada from British Columbia
Progressive Conservative Party of Canada MPs
Politicians from Shanghai
Women members of the House of Commons of Canada
Women members of the Senate of Canada
Women in British Columbia politics
People from Nelson, British Columbia
Members of the 24th Canadian Ministry
21st-century Canadian politicians
21st-century Canadian women politicians
20th-century Canadian women politicians
Women government ministers of Canada